Benedict John Francis (born 3 May 1972) is a stage actor and director based in Winchester, UK.

Early life 
Benedict John Francis was born in Isleworth, London, the son of parents Sally (née Steed) and Jaime Francis, who divorced when he was eight years old. His mother subsequently remarried and moved to Paris, with Alan Paul Levy, who originated from Manchester, UK. His father moved to New Zealand, working in the airline industry until his death in 1994. Francis attended several schools including The British School of Paris, France.

Career 
1990s
In 1993, Francis' first introduction to the stage came when he was selected as an extra in West Side Story, which ran at the Theatre Royal in Winchester, UK. This led on to further productions with the Winchester Musical Company. His first support role came in 1994 as Herr Schultz in Cabaret. He performed in several repertory level productions and had his first taste of Shakespeare as Don Pedro from Much Ado About Nothing in 1996 for which he received critical acclaim. Francis returned to musical theatre in 1997 for his first lead role as The Pirate King in Gilbert and Sullivan's The Pirates of Penzance, which ran at The John Stripe Theatre, UK. He then took a sabbatical of almost eight years in order to focus on his family.

2000s
In 2005, Francis returned to the stage as Oberon in William Shakespeare's A Midsummer Night's Dream. In 2006, Francis continued his love for Shakespearean roles as Sir Toby Belch in Twelfth Night and in 2007 played a critically acclaimed Benedick in Much Ado About Nothing. Having a background in comedy productions in the 1990s, Francis took part in a production of Modern Major General staged by Proteus Theatre in 2007, rewriting much of his dialogue himself. This led him to setting up Winchester-based repertory company Tribe Theatre in 2007. Their first production was a production of Shakespeare's The Merchant of Venice, in which Francis took the roles of both director and Shylock. Tribe Theatre's next production is set to continue the Shakespeare trend in the shape of The Tempest.

Music and projects
Francis is also an accomplished composer having written two albums (Fantasy & White Light) and composed the music for many of the productions he has been involved with. He is a well established graphic designer and software creator and set up the award-winning Blueburst and TheMediaSet - new media agencies in the UK. He is currently writing a stageplay based on his experience in and out of the theatre, under the working title of "Playing Willy" and a musical set in the movie industry entitled "In Hollywood".

External links 

Benedict Francis Official Homepage 

1972 births
Living people
English male stage actors
English male Shakespearean actors
Male actors from London
People from Isleworth